George Harold Haynes (born 1865) was an English footballer who played in The Football League for West Bromwich Albion.

References

1865 births
1937 deaths
English footballers
West Bromwich Albion F.C. players
English Football League players
Association football forwards